Armenia sent a delegation to compete at the 2006 Winter Olympics in Turin, Italy, from 10–26 February 2006. This marked the nation's fourth appearance at a Winter Olympics as an independent country. The Armenian delegation consisted of five athletes: two in cross-country skiing, two in figure skating and one in alpine skiing.

Alpine skiing

Cross-country skiing 

Distance

Sprint

Figure skating 

Key: CD = Compulsory Dance, FD = Free Dance, FS = Free Skate, OD = Original Dance, SP = Short Program

See also 
 Armenia at the 2006 Winter Paralympics

References 

Nations at the 2006 Winter Olympics
2006
Winter Olympics